Kidwelly Castle is a Norman castle overlooking the River Gwendraeth and the town of Kidwelly, Carmarthenshire, Wales. The origin of this surname traces back to when it was spelled Cygweli which means "swan."

Early history
The castle dates from a decision in the very early years of the 12th century to entrust Roger, bishop of Salisbury, as lord of Kidwelly. The castle and adjoining town were built soon after.

History and description
The present remains of the castle date from the early 12th century. Created as a defence against the Welsh, the castle fell to the Welsh several times in the twelfth century. The Prince of Wales named Lord Rhys, as he was later known, captured Kidwelly Castle in 1159 and was recognised by King Henry II of England as the ruler of the region. Upon his death, it was passed to the Anglo-Normans. The castle was captured and razed by Llywelyn the Great in 1231. Later in its history, it was unsuccessfully besieged by forces of Owain Glyndŵr in August 1403 with assistance from soldiers from France and Brittany who captured Kidwelly town. The castle was relieved by a Norman army in September 1403.

The plan of the castle consists of a square inner bailey defended by four round towers, which overlook a semi-circular outer curtain wall on the landward side, with the massive gatehouse next to the river.  The river prevents this from being a truly concentric plan, however a jutting tower protects the riverside walls, and the final plan is very strong. The castle is relatively well-preserved, and is managed by Cadw.

The surrounding countryside is reputedly haunted by the headless ghost of Gwenllian ferch Gruffydd, wife of the Welsh prince Gruffydd ap Rhys, who was beheaded in 1136.

In film
Kidwelly was used as a location for the 1975 film Monty Python and the Holy Grail, appearing in the very first scene after the titles.

Gallery

See also
List of Cadw properties
List of castles in Wales
Castles in Great Britain and Ireland

References

Sources

External links

 Cadw page 

Castles in Carmarthenshire
Cadw
Castle ruins in Wales
Hill castles
Grade I listed buildings in Carmarthenshire
Grade I listed castles in Wales
Castle